Retaliate is Angerfist's third studio album. It is a 3-CD album.

Track listing

Disc 1

Disc 2

Disc 3

Notes
Angerfist aliases in the artist field are not listed on the cover

External links
 Retaliate at Discogs

2011 albums
Angerfist albums